William H. Perry III (born February 16, 1940, in Joplin, Missouri) was an American politician who served as a Missouri state representative.  Perry was educated at the University of Kansas, the Washington College of Law, and the American University.  
He served as assistant prosecuting attorney of Jasper County from 1967 until 1969 and as city attorney of Webb City from 1966 until 1974.

References

1940 births
Living people
Republican Party members of the Missouri House of Representatives